These are the statistics for the Euro 2004 in Portugal.

Goalscorers

Penalty kicks
Not counting penalty shoot-outs, there were eight penalty kicks awarded during the tournament. England's David Beckham (in the match against France) was the only player who failed to convert his penalty.

Scored
 Angelos Basinas in the first match against Portugal
 Zinedine Zidane in a match against England
 Milan Rapaić in a match against France
 Zlatan Ibrahimović in a match against Bulgaria
 Martin Petrov in a match against Italy
 Henrik Larsson in a match against Denmark
 Ruud van Nistelrooy in a match against Latvia

Missed
 David Beckham in a match against France, saved by Fabien Barthez

Awards
UEFA Team of the Tournament

Golden Boot
 Milan Baroš (5 goals)

UEFA Player of the Tournament
 Theodoros Zagorakis

Scoring
Total number of goals scored: 77
Average goals per match: 2.48
Top scorer(s): 5 –  Milan Baroš
Most goals scored by a team: 10 – , 
Most goals conceded by a team: 9 – 
Fewest goals conceded by a team: 2 – , 
First goal of the tournament:  Giorgos Karagounis vs. 
Last goal of the tournament:  Angelos Charisteas vs. 
Fastest goal in a match: 68 seconds –  Dmitri Kirichenko vs. 
Latest goal in a match without extra time: 90+4 minutes –  Antonio Cassano vs. 
Latest goal in a match with extra time: 115 minutes –  Frank Lampard vs.

Attendance
Overall attendance: 1,162,762
Average attendance per match: 37,508

Wins and losses
Most wins: 4 –  Greece, Czech Republic, Portugal
Fewest wins: 0 – Bulgaria,  Croatia, Germany, Latvia, Switzerland
Most losses: 3 – Bulgaria
Fewest losses: 0 – Italy

Discipline
Sanctions against foul play at UEFA Euro 2004 are in the first instance the responsibility of the referee, but when he deems it necessary to give a caution, or dismiss a player, UEFA keeps a record and may enforce a suspension. Referee decisions are generally seen as final.  However, UEFA's disciplinary committee may additionally penalise players for offences unpunished by the referee.

Overview

Red cards
A player receiving a red card is automatically suspended for the next match.  A longer suspension is possible if the UEFA disciplinary committee judges the offence as warranting it. In keeping with the FIFA Disciplinary Code (FDC) and UEFA Disciplinary Regulations (UDR), UEFA does not allow for appeals of red cards except in the case of mistaken identity. The FDC further stipulates that if a player is sent off during his team's final Euro 2004 match, the suspension carries over to his team's next competitive international(s). For Euro 2004 these were the qualification matches for the 2006 FIFA World Cup.

Any player who was suspended due to a red card that was earned in Euro 2004 qualifying was required to serve the balance of any suspension unserved by the end of qualifying either in the Euro 2004 finals (for any player on a team that qualified, whether he had been selected to the final squad or not) or in World Cup qualifying (for players on teams that did not qualify).

Yellow cards
Any player receiving a single yellow card during two of the three group stage matches plus the quarter-final match is suspended for the next match. A single yellow card does not carry over to the semi-finals. This means that no player will be suspended for final unless he gets sent off in semi-final or he is serving a longer suspension for an earlier incident. Suspensions due to yellow cards will not carry over to the World Cup qualifiers. Yellow cards and any related suspensions earned in the Euro 2004 qualifiers are neither counted nor enforced in the final tournament.

In the event a player is sent off for two bookable offences, only the red card is counted for disciplinary purposes.  However, in the event a player receives a direct red card after being booked in the same match, then both cards are counted.  If the player was already facing a suspension for two tournament bookings when he was sent off, this would result in separate suspensions that would be served consecutively.  The one match ban for the yellow cards would be served first unless the player's team is eliminated in the match in which he was sent off.  If the player's team is eliminated in the match in which he was serving his ban for the yellow cards, then the ban for the sending off would be carried over to the World Cup qualifiers.

Additional punishment
For serious transgressions, a longer suspension may be handed down at the discretion of the UEFA disciplinary committee. The disciplinary committee is also charged with reviewing any incidents that were missed by the officials and can award administrative red cards and suspensions accordingly. However, just as appeals of red cards are not considered, the disciplinary committee is also not allowed to review transgressions that were already punished by the referee with something less than a red card. For example, if a player is booked but not sent off for a dangerous tackle, the disciplinary committee cannot subsequently deem the challenge to be violent conduct and then upgrade the card to a red. However, if the same player then spits at the opponent but is still not sent off, then the referee's report would be unlikely to mention this automatic red card offence. Video evidence of the spitting incident could then be independently reviewed.

Unlike the rules in many domestic competitions, there is no particular category of red card offence that automatically results in a multi-game suspension. In general however, extended bans are only assessed for red cards given for serious foul play, violent conduct, spitting or perhaps foul and abusive language. Also, unlike many sets of domestic rules second and subsequent red cards also do not automatically incur an extended ban, although a player's past disciplinary record (including prior competition) might be considered by the disciplinary committee when punishing him. As a rule, only automatic red card offenses are considered for longer bans. A player who gets sent off for picking up two yellow cards in the same match will not have his automatic one-match ban extended by UEFA on account of what he did to get the second booking, because the referee has deemed him as not to have committed an automatic red card offense.

If UEFA suspends a player after his team's elimination from the tournament, or for more games than the team ends up playing without him prior to the final or their elimination (whichever comes first), then the remaining suspension must be served during World Cup qualifying. For a particularly grave offence UEFA has the power to impose a lengthy ban against the offender.

Disciplinary statistics
Total number of yellow cards:  156
Average yellow cards per match: 5.03
Total number of red cards:  6
Average red cards per match: 0.19
First yellow card: Costinha against Greece
First red card: Roman Sharonov against Spain
Most yellow cards: 18 – Greece
Fewest yellow cards: 3 – Latvia
Most yellow cards in a match: 9 – Spain vs. Russia, Bulgaria vs. Denmark, Switzerland vs. Croatia
Most yellow cards by one referee: 19 –  Anders Frisk

By individual

Red cards
Six red cards were shown over the course of the tournament's 31 matches, an average of 0.19 red cards per match.

1 red card
  Stiliyan Petrov
  John Heitinga
  Sergei Ovchinnikov
  Roman Sharonov
  Bernt Haas
  Johann Vogel

Yellow cards
156 yellow cards were shown over the course of the tournament's 31 matches, an average of 5.03 yellow cards per match

4 yellow cards
 Giorgos Karagounis

3 yellow cards
 Giourkas Seitardis
 Costinha
 Roman Sharonov

2 yellow cards
  Rosen Kirilov
  Martin Petrov
  Stiliyan Petrov
  Ilian Stoyanov
  Tomáš Galásek
  Zisis Vryzas
  Theodoros Zagorakis
  Fabio Cannavaro
  Gennaro Gattuso
  John Heitinga
  Ricardo Carvalho
  Deco
  Pauleta
  Nuno Valente
  Dmitri Alenichev
  Vladislav Radimov
  Alexey Smertin
  Carlos Marchena
  Erik Edman
  Zlatan Ibrahimović
  Tobias Linderoth
  Bernt Haas
  Benjamin Huggel
  Johann Vogel

1 yellow card
  Valeri Bojinov
  Marian Hristov
  Vladimir Ivanov
  Zoran Janković
  Zdravko Lazarov
  Ivaylo Petkov
  Zlatomir Zagorčić
  Nenad Bjelica
  Robert Kovač
  Jerko Leko

1 yellow card (cont.)
  Ivica Mornar
  Dado Pršo
  Milan Rapaić
  Đovani Roso
  Dario Šimić
  Darijo Srna
  Igor Tudor
  Boris Živković
  Milan Baroš
  Marek Jankulovski
  Pavel Nedvěd
  Vladimír Šmicer
  Roman Týce
  Tomáš Ujfaluši
  Kasper Bøgelund
  Thomas Gravesen
  Thomas Helveg
  Niclas Jensen
  Christian Poulsen
  Ebbe Sand
  Jon Dahl Tomasson
  Steven Gerrard
  David James
  Frank Lampard
  Gary Neville
  Phil Neville
  Wayne Rooney
  Paul Scholes
  Olivier Dacourt
  Thierry Henry
  Robert Pires
  Louis Saha
  Mikaël Silvestre
  Patrick Vieira
  Zinedine Zidane
  Michael Ballack
  Arne Friedrich
  Torsten Frings
  Dietmar Hamann
  Kevin Kurányi
  Philipp Lahm
  Jens Nowotny

1 yellow card (cont.)
  Christian Wörns
  Angelos Basinas
  Angelos Charisteas
  Traianos Dellas
  Takis Fyssas
  Stelios Giannakopoulos
  Kostas Katsouranis
  Dimitrios Papadopoulos
  Marco Materazzi
  Francesco Totti
  Gianluca Zambrotta
  Vitālijs Astafjevs
  Aleksandrs Isakovs
  Valentīns Lobaņovs
  Frank de Boer
  Phillip Cocu
  Roy Makaay
  Marc Overmars
  Arjen Robben
  Clarence Seedorf
  Andy van der Meyde
  Luís Figo
  Nuno Gomes
  Cristiano Ronaldo
  Evgeni Aldonin
  Aleksandr Anyukov
  Vadim Evseev
  Rolan Gusev
  Andrei Karyaka
  Vyacheslav Malafeev
  David Albelda
  Rubén Baraja
  Iván Helguera
  Carlos Puyol
  Kim Källström
  Alexander Östlund
  Fabio Celestini
  Jörg Stiel
  Raphaël Wicky
  Hakan Yakin

By referee

By team

Clean sheets
Most clean sheets (team): 3 – Greece
Fewest clean sheets (team): 0 – Bulgaria, France, Russia

UEFA Euro 2004 didn't have a third and fourth place match so teams eliminated in the semi-final came joint third.

Overall statistics
In the following tables:
 Pld = total games played
 W = total games won
 D = total games drawn (tied)
 L = total games lost
 Pts = total points accumulated (teams receive three points for a win, one point for a draw and no points for a loss)
 APts = average points per game
 GF = total goals scored (goals for)
 AGF = average goals scored per game
 GA = total goals conceded (goals against)
 AGA = average goals conceded per game
 GD = goal difference (GF−GA)
 CS = clean sheets
 ACS = average clean sheets
 YC = yellow cards
 AYC = average yellow cards
 RC = red cards
 ARC = average red cards

BOLD indicates that this nation has the highest 
Italics indicates the host nation

References

Statistics
2004